Martin Bell (born 6 December 1964, RAF Akrotiri, Cyprus) is a British former World Cup alpine ski racer.

Bell was educated at George Watson's College in Edinburgh and the Stams Schigymnasium in Austria.
He competed in four Winter Olympics from 1984 to 1994, placing eighth in the downhill at the 1988 Games in Calgary, Canada – the best result for a male skier from the UK in Olympic history.

He also competed at five World Championships from 1985 to 1993. Martin Bell and his brother, Graham Bell were the two most successful British skiers in the 1980s and 1990s.

Bell now lives near Vail, Colorado, US.  He is married to Laura Bell and has two daughters, Reece and Imogen.

References

1964 births
Living people
People educated at George Watson's College
British male alpine skiers
Scottish male alpine skiers
Olympic alpine skiers of Great Britain
Alpine skiers at the 1984 Winter Olympics
Alpine skiers at the 1988 Winter Olympics
Alpine skiers at the 1992 Winter Olympics
Alpine skiers at the 1994 Winter Olympics
Akrotiri and Dhekelia people